John Wilfrid Greenstock (15 May 1905 – 6 February 1992) was an English first-class cricketer who played in 46 matches in the 1920s, the bulk of these for Oxford University and Worcestershire.

Greenstock made his first-class debut for Worcestershire against Northamptonshire at Worcester in August 1924, but was not called upon to bowl a single ball.

He played one further match that summer, against Somerset, and this time claimed 4-69 including the wicket of Jack White, but Worcestershire were nevertheless heavily defeated.

From 1925 to 1927, Greenstock played mostly for Oxford, winning a Blue in all three years.

In 1926 he played no county cricket, but he did turn out for Worcestershire a few times in 1925 and 1927. It was during this period that he achieved career-bests both in bowling (5-36 for against the Army at The University Parks in June 1926) and in batting (43 against Essex at Chelmsford in June 1927); both these feats were performed for Oxford.

After that, Greenstock played only two more first-class matches, for Free Foresters against Oxford in 1928, and for H. D. G. Leveson-Gower's XI against Cambridge University the following year. He bowled only seven overs in that final match, taking the single wicket of William Harbison.

Greenstock was born in Great Malvern, Worcestershire; he died in a Gloucester hospital at the age of 86.

He was the nephew of the seven Foster brothers, all of whom played first-class cricket for Worcestershire. Like them, he was also educated at Malvern College but he did not show great potential at cricket there. His cousin Peter Foster played for Oxford and Kent, while another cousin (Christopher Foster) and his father William Greenstock also had short first-class careers.

References

External links
 

1905 births
1992 deaths
English cricketers
Free Foresters cricketers
People educated at Malvern College
Alumni of Brasenose College, Oxford
Oxford University cricketers
People from Malvern, Worcestershire
Worcestershire cricketers
Foster family
H. D. G. Leveson Gower's XI cricketers
Sportspeople from Worcestershire